Alex Rogers (born  in England) was a rugby union player.  he played for the Newcastle Falcons in the English Premiership.

Rogers played as a prop. Previously he played for Harlequins.

References 

1986 births
Living people
English rugby union players
Newcastle Falcons players